Las Palmas is a corregimiento in Macaracas District, Los Santos Province, Panama with a population of 436 as of 2010. Its population as of 1990 was 579; its population as of 2000 was 473.

References

Corregimientos of Los Santos Province